George Walker Warnock (May 4, 1869 – November 20, 1958) was a Canadian politician. He served in the Legislative Assembly of New Brunswick from 1921 to 1925 as member of the United Farmers. He died in 1958.

References 

1869 births
1958 deaths